Castrofilippo (Sicilian: Castrufilippu) is a comune (municipality) in the Province of Agrigento in the Italian region Sicily, located about  southeast of Palermo and about  east of Agrigento.

Castrofilippo borders the following municipalities: Canicattì, Favara, Naro, Racalmuto.

Demographic evolution

References

External links
 www.comune.castrofilippo.ag.it/

Cities and towns in Sicily